Following is a list of Ministers of Interior and Justice of Venezuela.

List 
Currently incomplete

 Andrés Narvarte (1832 - )
Francisco González Guinán (1887 - 1888)
Juan Francisco Castillo (1899 – 1900)
Rafael Cabrera Malo	(1900 – 1901)
José Antonio Velutini	(1901 – 1902)
Rafael López Baralt	(1902 –1903)
Leopoldo Baptista	(1903 – 1907)
Julio Torres Cárdenas	(1907)
Rafael López Baralt (1907 -1908)
 Pedro Tinoco Smith (1931 - 1936)
Diógenes Escalante	(1936)
 Alejandro Lara	(1936)
 Régulo Olivares (1936 – 1937)
 Alfonso Mejía	(1937 – 1938)
 Luis Gerónimo Pietri	(1938–1941)
 Valmore Rodríguez	(1945 – 1946)
 Mario Ricardo Vargas (1946 – 1948)
 Luis Felipe Urbaneja Blanco (1952 - 1958)
 Luis Augusto Dubuc (1959 - 1962)
 Carlos Andrés Pérez (1962 - 1963)
 Manuel Mantilla (1963 - 1964)
 Gonzalo Barrios (1964 - 1966)
 Reinaldo Leandro Mora (1966 - 1969)
 Lorenzo Fernández (1969 – 1972)
 Nectario Andrade Labarca	(1972 – 1974)
 Luis Piñerúa Ordaz (1974 – 1975)
 Octavio Lepage (1975 - 1978)
 Manuel Mantilla (1978 - 1979)
 Rafael Montes de Oca (1979 – 1982)
 Luciano Valero (1982 – 1984)
 Octavio Lepage (1984 - 1986)
 José Ángel Ciliberto (1986 – 1988)
 Simón Alberto Consalvi (1988 – 1989)
 Alejandro Izaguirre	(1989 – 1992)
 Virgilio Ávila Vivas	(1992)
 Carmelo Lauría Lesseur	(1992)
 Luis Piñerúa Ordaz	(1992 – 1993)
 Jesús Ramón Carmona (1993)
 Ramón Escovar Salom	(1994 – 1996)
 José Guillermo Andueza	(1996 – 1998)
 Asdrúbal Aguiar (1998 – 1999)
 Ignacio Arcaya (February 1999 - 2000)
 Luis Alfonso Dávila (2000 - February 2001)
 Luis Miquilena (February 2001 - January 2002)
 Ramón Rodríguez Chacín (January 2002 – May 2002)
 Diosdado Cabello (May 2002 - January 2003)
 Lucas Rincón Romero (January 2003 - September 2004)
 Jesse Chacón (September 2004 - January 2007)
 Pedro Carreño (January 2007 - January 2008)
 Ramón Rodríguez Chacín (January 2008 – September 2008)
 Tarek El Aissami (September 2008 - October 2012)
Néstor Luis Reverol Torres (October 2012 - April 2013)
Miguel Rodríguez Torres (April 2013 - October 2014 )
Carmen Melendez Teresa Rivas (October 2014 - March 2015)
Gustavo González López (10 March 2015 - 3 August 2016)
Néstor Luis Reverol Torres (3 August 2016 - present)

See also

List of Ministers of Foreign Affairs of Venezuela 
Venezuelan Ministers of Interior
Interior